Sir Winston Leonard Spencer Churchill (30 November 187424 January 1965) was a British statesman, soldier, and writer who served as Prime Minister of the United Kingdom twice, from 1940 to 1945 during the Second World War, and again from 1951 to 1955. Apart from two years between 1922 and 1924, he was a Member of Parliament (MP) from 1900 to 1964 and represented a total of five constituencies. Ideologically an economic liberal and imperialist, he was for most of his career a member of the Conservative Party, which he led from 1940 to 1955. He was a member of the Liberal Party from 1904 to 1924.

Of mixed English and American parentage, Churchill was born in Oxfordshire to a wealthy, aristocratic family. He joined the British Army in 1895 and saw action in British India, the Anglo-Sudan War, and the Second Boer War, gaining fame as a war correspondent and writing books about his campaigns. Elected a Conservative MP in 1900, he defected to the Liberals in 1904. In H. H. Asquith's Liberal government, Churchill served as President of the Board of Trade and Home Secretary, championing prison reform and workers' social security. As First Lord of the Admiralty during the First World War, he oversaw the Gallipoli Campaign but, after it proved a disaster, he was demoted to Chancellor of the Duchy of Lancaster. He resigned in November 1915 and joined the Royal Scots Fusiliers on the Western Front for six months. In 1917, he returned to government under David Lloyd George and served successively as Minister of Munitions, Secretary of State for War, Secretary of State for Air, and Secretary of State for the Colonies, overseeing the Anglo-Irish Treaty and British foreign policy in the Middle East. After two years out of Parliament, he served as Chancellor of the Exchequer in Stanley Baldwin's Conservative government, returning the pound sterling in 1925 to the gold standard at its pre-war parity, a move widely seen as creating deflationary pressure and depressing the UK economy.

Out of government during his so-called "wilderness years" in the 1930s, Churchill took the lead in calling for British rearmament to counter the growing threat of militarism in Nazi Germany. At the outbreak of the Second World War he was re-appointed First Lord of the Admiralty. In May 1940, he became Prime Minister, succeeding Neville Chamberlain. Churchill formed a national government and oversaw British involvement in the Allied war effort against the Axis powers, resulting in victory in 1945. After the Conservatives' defeat in the 1945 general election, he became Leader of the Opposition. Amid the developing Cold War with the Soviet Union, he publicly warned of an "iron curtain" of Soviet influence in Europe and promoted European unity. Between his terms as Prime Minister, he wrote several books recounting his experience during the war. He was awarded the Nobel Prize for Literature in 1953. He lost the 1950 election, but was returned to office in 1951. His second term was preoccupied with foreign affairs, especially Anglo-American relations and preservation of what remained of the British Empire with India now no longer part of it. Domestically, his government emphasised housebuilding and completed the development of a nuclear weapon (begun by his predecessor). In declining health, Churchill resigned as Prime Minister in 1955, remaining an MP until 1964. Upon his death in 1965, he was given a state funeral.

Widely considered one of the 20th century's most significant figures, Churchill remains popular in the Anglosphere, where he is seen as a victorious wartime leader who played an important role in defending Europe's liberal democracy against the spread of fascism. He has been criticised for some wartime events and also for his imperialist views.

Early life

Childhood and schooling: 1874–1895

Churchill was born on 30 November 1874 at his family's ancestral home, Blenheim Palace in Oxfordshire. On his father's side, he was a member of the British aristocracy as a direct descendant of the 1st Duke of Marlborough. His father, Lord Randolph Churchill, representing the Conservative Party, had been elected Member of Parliament (MP) for Woodstock in 1873. His mother, Jennie, was a daughter of Leonard Jerome, a wealthy American businessman.

In 1876, Churchill's paternal grandfather, John Spencer-Churchill, 7th Duke of Marlborough, was appointed Viceroy of Ireland, then part of the United Kingdom. Randolph became his private secretary and the family relocated to Dublin. Winston's brother, Jack, was born there in 1880. Throughout much of the 1880s, Randolph and Jennie were effectively estranged, and the brothers were mostly cared for by their nanny, Elizabeth Everest. When she died in 1895, Churchill wrote that "she had been my dearest and most intimate friend during the whole of the twenty years I had lived".

Churchill began boarding at St George's School in Ascot, Berkshire, at age seven but was not academic and his behaviour was poor. In 1884 he transferred to Brunswick School in Hove, where his academic performance improved. In April 1888, aged 13, he narrowly passed the entrance exam for Harrow School. His father wanted him to prepare for a military career and so his last three years at Harrow were in the army form. After two unsuccessful attempts to gain admittance to the Royal Military Academy, Sandhurst, he succeeded on his third. He was accepted as a cadet in the cavalry, starting in September 1893. His father died in January 1895, a month after Churchill graduated from Sandhurst.

Cuba, India, and Sudan: 1895–1899

In February 1895, Churchill was commissioned as a second lieutenant in the 4th Queen's Own Hussars regiment of the British Army, based at Aldershot. Eager to witness military action, he used his mother's influence to get himself posted to a war zone. In the autumn of 1895, he and his friend Reggie Barnes, then a subaltern, went to Cuba to observe the war of independence and became involved in skirmishes after joining Spanish troops attempting to suppress independence fighters. Churchill sent reports about the conflict to the Daily Graphic in London. He proceeded to New York City and, in admiration of the United States, wrote to his mother about "what an extraordinary people the Americans are!". With the Hussars, he went to Bombay in October 1896. Based in Bangalore, he was in India for 19 months, visiting Calcutta three times and joining expeditions to Hyderabad and the North West Frontier.

In India, Churchill began a self-education project, reading a range of authors including Plato, Edward Gibbon, Charles Darwin and Thomas Babington Macaulay. The books were sent to him by his mother, with whom he shared frequent correspondence when abroad. In order to learn about politics, he also asked his mother to send him copies of The Annual Register, the political almanac. In one 1898 letter to her, he referred to his religious beliefs, saying: "I do not accept the Christian or any other form of religious belief". Churchill had been christened in the Church of England but, as he related later, he underwent a virulently anti-Christian phase in his youth, and as an adult was an agnostic. In another letter to one of his cousins, he referred to religion as "a delicious narcotic" and expressed a preference for Protestantism over Roman Catholicism because he felt it "a step nearer Reason".

Interested in British parliamentary affairs, he declared himself "a Liberal in all but name", adding that he could never endorse the Liberal Party's support for Irish home rule. Instead, he allied himself to the Tory democracy wing of the Conservative Party and on a visit home, gave his first public speech for the party's Primrose League at Claverton Down, near Bath. Mixing reformist and conservative perspectives, he supported the promotion of secular, non-denominational education while opposing women's suffrage.

Churchill volunteered to join Bindon Blood's Malakand Field Force in its campaign against Mohmand rebels in the Swat Valley of north-west India. Blood accepted him on condition that he was assigned as a journalist, the beginning of Churchill's writing career. He returned to Bangalore in October 1897 and there wrote his first book, The Story of the Malakand Field Force, which received positive reviews. He also wrote his only work of fiction, Savrola, a Ruritanian romance. To keep himself fully occupied, Churchill embraced writing as what Roy Jenkins calls his "whole habit", especially through his political career when he was out of office. Writing was his main safeguard against recurring depression, which he referred to as his "black dog".

Using his contacts in London, Churchill got himself attached to General Kitchener's campaign in the Sudan as a 21st Lancers subaltern while, additionally, working as a journalist for The Morning Post. After fighting in the Battle of Omdurman on 2 September 1898, the 21st Lancers were stood down. In October, Churchill returned to England and began writing The River War, an account of the campaign which was published in November 1899; it was at this time that he decided to leave the army. He was critical of Kitchener's actions during the war, particularly the latter's unmerciful treatment of enemy wounded and his desecration of Muhammad Ahmad's tomb in Omdurman.

On 2 December 1898, Churchill embarked for India to settle his military business and complete his resignation from the 4th Hussars. He spent a lot of his time there playing polo, the only ball sport in which he was ever interested. Having left the Hussars, he sailed from Bombay on 20 March 1899, determined to launch a career in politics.

Politics and South Africa: 1899–1901

Seeking a parliamentary career, Churchill spoke at Conservative meetings and was selected as one of the party's two parliamentary candidates for the June 1899 by-election in Oldham, Lancashire. While campaigning in Oldham, Churchill referred to himself as "a Conservative and a Tory Democrat". Although the Oldham seats had previously been held by the Conservatives, the result was a narrow Liberal victory.

Anticipating the outbreak of the Second Boer War between Britain and the Boer Republics, Churchill sailed to South Africa as a journalist for the Morning Post under the editorship of James Nicol Dunn. In October, he travelled to the conflict zone near Ladysmith, then besieged by Boer troops, before heading for Colenso. After his train was derailed by Boer artillery shelling, he was captured as a prisoner of war (POW) and interned in a Boer POW camp in Pretoria. In December, Churchill escaped from the prison and evaded his captors by stowing away aboard freight trains and hiding in a mine. He eventually made it to safety in Portuguese East Africa. His escape attracted much publicity.

In January 1900, he briefly rejoined the army as a lieutenant in the South African Light Horse regiment, joining Redvers Buller's fight to relieve the Siege of Ladysmith and take Pretoria. He was among the first British troops into both places. He and his cousin, the 9th Duke of Marlborough, demanded and received the surrender of 52 Boer prison camp guards. Throughout the war, he had publicly chastised anti-Boer prejudices, calling for them to be treated with "generosity and tolerance", and after the war he urged the British to be magnanimous in victory. In July, having resigned his lieutenancy, he returned to Britain. His Morning Post despatches had been published as London to Ladysmith via Pretoria and had sold well.

Churchill rented a flat in London's Mayfair, using it as his base for the next six years. He stood again as one of the Conservative candidates at Oldham in the October 1900 general election, securing a narrow victory to become a Member of Parliament at age 25. In the same month, he published Ian Hamilton's March, a book about his South African experiences, which became the focus of a lecture tour in November through Britain, America and Canada. Members of Parliament were unpaid and the tour was a financial necessity. In America, Churchill met Mark Twain, President McKinley and Vice President Theodore Roosevelt; he did not get on well with Roosevelt. Later, in spring 1901, he gave more lectures in Paris, Madrid and Gibraltar.

Conservative MP: 1901–1904

In February 1901, Churchill took his seat in the House of Commons, where his maiden speech gained widespread press coverage. He associated with a group of Conservatives known as the Hughligans, but he was critical of the Conservative government on various issues, especially increases in army funding. He believed that additional military expenditure should go to the navy. This upset the Conservative front bench but was supported by Liberals, with whom he increasingly socialised, particularly Liberal Imperialists like H. H. Asquith. In this context, Churchill later wrote that he "drifted steadily to the left" of parliamentary politics. He privately considered "the gradual creation by an evolutionary process of a Democratic or Progressive wing to the Conservative Party", or alternately a "Central Party" to unite the Conservatives and Liberals.

By 1903, there was real division between Churchill and the Conservatives, largely because he opposed their promotion of economic protectionism. As a free trader, he took part in the foundation of the Free Food League. Churchill sensed that the animosity of many party members would prevent him from gaining a Cabinet position under a Conservative government. The Liberal Party was then attracting growing support, and so his defection in 1904 may also have been influenced by personal ambition. He increasingly voted with the Liberals against the government. For example, he opposed an increase in military expenditure; he supported a Liberal bill to restore legal rights to trade unions; and he opposed the introduction of tariffs on goods imported into the British Empire, describing himself as a "sober admirer" of the principles of free trade. Arthur Balfour's government announced protectionist legislation in October 1903. Two months later, incensed by Churchill's criticism of the government, the Oldham Conservative Association informed him that it would not support his candidature at the next general election.

In May 1904, Churchill opposed the government's proposed Aliens Bill, designed to curb Jewish migration into Britain. He stated that the bill would "appeal to insular prejudice against foreigners, to racial prejudice against Jews, and to labour prejudice against competition" and expressed himself in favour of "the old tolerant and generous practice of free entry and asylum to which this country has so long adhered and from which it has so greatly gained". On 31 May 1904, he crossed the floor, defecting from the Conservatives to sit as a member of the Liberal Party in the House of Commons.

Liberal MP: 1904–1908

As a Liberal, Churchill attacked government policy and gained a reputation as a radical under the influences of John Morley and David Lloyd George. In December 1905, Balfour resigned as Prime Minister and King Edward VII invited the Liberal leader Henry Campbell-Bannerman to take his place. Hoping to secure a working majority in the House of Commons, Campbell-Bannerman called a general election in January 1906, which the Liberals won. Churchill won the Manchester North West seat. In the same month, his biography of his father was published; he received an advance payment of £8,000. It was generally well received. It was also at this time that the first biography of Churchill himself, written by the Liberal Alexander MacCallum Scott, was published.

In the new government, Churchill became Under-Secretary of State for the Colonial Office, a junior ministerial position that he had requested. He worked beneath the Secretary of State for the Colonies, Victor Bruce, 9th Earl of Elgin, and took Edward Marsh as his secretary; Marsh remained Churchill's secretary for 25 years. Churchill's first task was helping to draft a constitution for the Transvaal; and he helped oversee the formation of a government in the Orange River Colony. In dealing with southern Africa, he sought to ensure equality between the British and the Boers. He also announced a gradual phasing out of the use of Chinese indentured labourers in South Africa; he and the government decided that a sudden ban would cause too much upset in the colony and might damage the economy. He expressed concerns about the relations between European settlers and the black African population; after the Zulu launched their Bambatha Rebellion in Natal, Churchill complained about the "disgusting butchery of the natives" by Europeans.

Asquith government: 1908–1915

President of the Board of Trade: 1908–1910

Asquith succeeded the terminally ill Campbell-Bannerman on 8 April 1908 and, four days later, Churchill was appointed President of the Board of Trade, succeeding Lloyd George who became Chancellor of the Exchequer. Aged 33, Churchill was the youngest Cabinet member since 1866. Newly appointed Cabinet ministers were legally obliged to seek re-election at a by-election and on 24 April, Churchill lost the Manchester North West by-election to the Conservative candidate by 429 votes. On 9 May, the Liberals stood him in the safe seat of Dundee, where he won comfortably.

In private life, Churchill proposed marriage to Clementine Hozier; they were married on 12 September 1908 at St Margaret's, Westminster and honeymooned in Baveno, Venice, and Veverí Castle in Moravia. They lived at 33 Eccleston Square, London, and their first daughter, Diana, was born in July 1909. Churchill and Clementine were married for over 56 years until his death. The success of his marriage was important to Churchill's career as Clementine's unbroken affection provided him with a secure and happy background.

One of Churchill's first tasks as a minister was to arbitrate in an industrial dispute among ship-workers and employers on the River Tyne. He afterwards established a Standing Court of Arbitration to deal with future industrial disputes, establishing a reputation as a conciliator. In Cabinet, he worked with Lloyd George to champion social reform. He promoted what he called a "network of State intervention and regulation" akin to that in Germany.

Continuing Lloyd George's work, Churchill introduced the Mines Eight Hours Bill, which legally prohibited miners from working more than an eight-hour day. He introduced the Trade Boards Bill, creating Trade Boards which could prosecute exploitative employers. Passing with a large majority, it established the principle of a minimum wage and the right of workers to have meal breaks. In May 1909, he proposed the Labour Exchanges Bill to establish over 200 Labour Exchanges through which the unemployed would be assisted in finding employment. He also promoted the idea of an unemployment insurance scheme, which would be part-funded by the state.

To ensure funding for their reforms, Lloyd George and Churchill denounced Reginald McKenna's policy of naval expansion, refusing to believe that war with Germany was inevitable. As Chancellor, Lloyd George presented his "People's Budget" on 29 April 1909, calling it a war budget to eliminate poverty. With Churchill as his closest ally, Lloyd George proposed unprecedented taxes on the rich to fund the Liberal welfare programmes. The budget was vetoed by the Conservative peers who dominated the House of Lords. His social reforms under threat, Churchill became president of the Budget League, and warned that upper-class obstruction could anger working-class Britons and lead to class war. The government called the January 1910 general election, which resulted in a narrow Liberal victory; Churchill retained his seat at Dundee. After the election, he proposed the abolition of the House of Lords in a cabinet memorandum, suggesting that it be succeeded either by a unicameral system or by a new, smaller second chamber that lacked an in-built advantage for the Conservatives. In April, the Lords relented and the People's Budget passed into law. Churchill continued to campaign against the House of Lords and assisted passage of the Parliament Act 1911 which reduced and restricted its powers.

Home Secretary: 1910–1911
In February 1910, Churchill was promoted to Home Secretary, giving him control over the police and prison services; he implemented a prison reform programme. Measures included a distinction between criminal and political prisoners, with prison rules for the latter being relaxed. There were educational innovations like the establishment of libraries for prisoners, and a requirement for each prison to stage entertainments four times a year. The rules on solitary confinement were relaxed somewhat, and Churchill proposed the abolition of automatic imprisonment of those who failed to pay fines. Imprisonment of people aged between 16 and 21 was abolished except for the most serious offences. Churchill commuted 21 of the 43 capital sentences passed while he was Home Secretary.

One of the major domestic issues in Britain was women's suffrage. Churchill supported giving women the vote, but he would only back a bill to that effect if it had majority support from the (male) electorate. His proposed solution was a referendum on the issue, but this found no favour with Asquith and women's suffrage remained unresolved until 1918. Many suffragettes believed that Churchill was a committed opponent of women's suffrage, and targeted his meetings for protest. In November 1910, the suffragist Hugh Franklin attacked Churchill with a whip; Franklin was arrested and imprisoned for six weeks.

In the summer of 1910, Churchill had to deal with the Tonypandy Riot, in which coal miners in the Rhondda Valley violently protested against their working conditions. The Chief Constable of Glamorgan requested troops to help police quell the rioting. Churchill, learning that the troops were already travelling, allowed them to go as far as Swindon and Cardiff, but blocked their deployment; he was concerned that the use of troops could lead to bloodshed. Instead he sent 270 London police, who were not equipped with firearms, to assist their Welsh counterparts. As the riots continued, he offered the protesters an interview with the government's chief industrial arbitrator, which they accepted. Privately, Churchill regarded both the mine owners and striking miners as being "very unreasonable". The Times and other media outlets accused him of being too soft on the rioters; in contrast, many in the Labour Party, which was linked to the trade unions, regarded him as having been too heavy-handed. In consequence of the latter, Churchill incurred the long-term suspicion of the labour movement.

Asquith called a general election in December 1910 and the Liberals were re-elected with Churchill secure in Dundee. In January 1911, Churchill became involved in the Siege of Sidney Street; three Latvian burglars had killed several police officers and hidden in a house in London's East End, which was surrounded by police. Churchill stood with the police though he did not direct their operation. After the house caught fire, he told the fire brigade not to proceed into the house because of the threat posed by the armed men. Afterwards, two of the burglars were found dead. Although he faced criticism for his decision, he stated that he "thought it better to let the house burn down rather than spend good British lives in rescuing those ferocious rascals".

In March 1911, Churchill introduced the second reading of the Coal Mines Bill in parliament. When implemented, it imposed stricter safety standards at coal mines. He also formulated the Shops Bill to improve the working conditions of shop workers; it faced opposition from shop owners and only passed into law in a much emasculated form. In April, Lloyd George introduced the first health and unemployment insurance legislation, the National Insurance Act 1911; Churchill had been instrumental in drafting it. In May, Clementine gave birth to their second child, Randolph, named after Churchill's father. In response to escalating civil strife in 1911, Churchill sent troops into Liverpool to quell protesting dockers and rallied against a national railway strike.

During the Agadir Crisis of April 1911, when there was a threat of war between France and Germany, Churchill suggested an alliance with France and Russia to safeguard the independence of Belgium, Denmark and the Netherlands to counter possible German expansionism. The Agadir Crisis had a profound effect on Churchill and he altered his views about the need for naval expansion.

First Lord of the Admiralty

In October 1911, Asquith appointed Churchill First Lord of the Admiralty, and he took up official residence at Admiralty House. He created a naval war staff and, over the next two and a half years, focused on naval preparation, visiting naval stations and dockyards, seeking to improve morale, and scrutinising German naval developments. After the German government passed its 1912 Naval Law to increase warship production, Churchill vowed that Britain would do the same and that for every new battleship built by the Germans, Britain would build two. He invited Germany to engage in a mutual de-escalation of naval building projects, but this was refused.

Churchill pushed for higher pay and greater recreational facilities for naval staff, an increase in the building of submarines, and a renewed focus on the Royal Naval Air Service, encouraging them to experiment with how aircraft could be used for military purposes. He coined the term "seaplane" and ordered 100 to be constructed. Some Liberals objected to his levels of naval expenditure; in December 1913 he threatened to resign if his proposal for four new battleships in 1914–15 was rejected. In June 1914, he convinced the House of Commons to authorise the government purchase of a 51 percent share in the profits of oil produced by the Anglo-Persian Oil Company, to secure continued oil access for the Royal Navy.

The central issue in Britain at the time was Irish Home Rule and, in 1912, Asquith's government introduced the Home Rule Bill. Churchill supported it and urged Ulster Unionists to accept it as he opposed the partition of Ireland. Concerning the possibility of the Partition of Ireland, Churchill stated: "Whatever Ulster's right may be, she cannot stand in the way of the whole of the rest of Ireland. Half a province cannot impose a permanent veto on the nation. Half a province cannot obstruct forever the reconciliation between the British and Irish democracies". Speaking in the House of Commons on 16 February 1922, Churchill said: "What Irishmen all over the world most desire is not hostility against this country, but the unity of their own". 
Later, following a Cabinet decision, he boosted the naval presence in Ireland to deal with any Unionist uprising. Seeking a compromise, Churchill suggested that Ireland remain part of a federal United Kingdom but this angered Liberals and Irish nationalists.

As First Lord, Churchill was tasked with overseeing Britain's naval effort when the First World War began in August 1914. In the same month, the navy transported 120,000 British troops to France and began a blockade of Germany's North Sea ports. Churchill sent submarines to the Baltic Sea to assist the Russian Navy and he sent the Marine Brigade to Ostend, forcing a reallocation of German troops. In September, Churchill assumed full responsibility for Britain's aerial defence. On 7 October, Clementine gave birth to their third child, Sarah. In October, Churchill visited Antwerp to observe Belgian defences against the besieging Germans and promised British reinforcements for the city. Soon afterwards, however, Antwerp fell to the Germans and Churchill was criticised in the press. He maintained that his actions had prolonged resistance and enabled the Allies to secure Calais and Dunkirk. In November, Asquith called a War Council, consisting of himself, Lloyd George, Edward Grey, Kitchener, and Churchill. Churchill set the development of the tank on the right track, and financed its creation with Admiralty funds.

Churchill was interested in the Middle Eastern theatre and wanted to relieve Turkish pressure on the Russians in the Caucasus by staging attacks against Turkey in the Dardanelles. He hoped that, if successful, the British could even seize Constantinople. Approval was given and, in March 1915, an Anglo-French task force attempted a naval bombardment of Turkish defences in the Dardanelles. In April, the Mediterranean Expeditionary Force, including the Australian and New Zealand Army Corps (ANZAC), began its assault at Gallipoli. Both campaigns failed and Churchill was held by many MPs, particularly Conservatives, to be personally responsible.

In May, Asquith agreed under parliamentary pressure to form an all-party coalition government, but the Conservatives' one condition of entry was that Churchill must be removed from the Admiralty. Churchill pleaded his case with both Asquith and Conservative leader Bonar Law, but had to accept demotion and became Chancellor of the Duchy of Lancaster.

Military service, 1915–1916

On 25 November 1915, Churchill resigned from the government, although he remained an MP. Asquith rejected his request to be appointed Governor-General of British East Africa.

Churchill decided to join the Army and was attached to the 2nd Grenadier Guards, on the Western Front. In January 1916, he was temporarily promoted to lieutenant-colonel and given command of the 6th Royal Scots Fusiliers. After a period of training, the battalion was moved to a sector of the Belgian Front near Ploegsteert. For over three months, they faced continual shelling although no German offensive. Churchill narrowly escaped death when, during a visit by his staff officer cousin the 9th Duke of Marlborough, a large piece of shrapnel fell between them. In May, the 6th Royal Scots Fusiliers were merged into the 15th Division. Churchill did not request a new command, instead securing permission to leave active service. His temporary promotion ended on 16 May 1916, when he returned to the rank of major.

Back in the House of Commons, Churchill spoke out on war issues, calling for conscription to be extended to the Irish, greater recognition of soldiers' bravery, and for the introduction of steel helmets for troops. It was in November 1916 that he penned "The greater application of mechanical power to the prosecution of an offensive on land", but it fell on deaf ears. He was frustrated at being out of office as a backbencher, but he was repeatedly blamed for Gallipoli, mainly by the pro-Conservative press. Churchill argued his case before the Dardanelles Commission, whose published report placed no blame on him personally for the campaign's failure.

Lloyd George government: 1916–1922

Minister of Munitions: 1917–1919
In October 1916, Asquith resigned as Prime Minister and was succeeded by Lloyd George who, in May 1917, sent Churchill to inspect the French war effort. In July, Churchill was appointed Minister of Munitions. He quickly negotiated an end to a strike in munitions factories along the Clyde and increased munitions production. It was in his October 1917 letter to the attention of his Cabinet colleagues that he penned the plan of attack for the next year that would bring final victory to the Allies. He ended a second strike, in June 1918, by threatening to conscript strikers into the army. In the House of Commons, Churchill voted in support of the Representation of the People Act 1918, which gave some British women the right to vote. In November 1918, four days after the Armistice, Churchill's fourth child, Marigold, was born.

Secretary of State for War and Air: 1919–1921

With the war over, Lloyd George called a general election with voting on Saturday, 14 December 1918. During the election campaign, Churchill called for the nationalisation of the railways, a control on monopolies, tax reform, and the creation of a League of Nations to prevent future wars. He was returned as MP for Dundee and, although the Conservatives won a majority, Lloyd George was retained as Prime Minister. In January 1919, Lloyd George moved Churchill to the War Office as both Secretary of State for War and Secretary of State for Air.

Churchill was responsible for demobilising the British Army, although he convinced Lloyd George to keep a million men conscripted for the British Army of the Rhine. Churchill was one of the few government figures who opposed harsh measures against the defeated Germany, and he cautioned against demobilising the German Army, warning that they may be needed as a bulwark against threats from the newly established Soviet Russia. He was an outspoken opponent of Vladimir Lenin's new Communist Party government in Russia. He initially supported the use of British troops to assist the anti-Communist White forces in the Russian Civil War, but soon recognised the desire of the British people to bring them home. After the Soviets won the civil war, Churchill proposed a cordon sanitaire around the country.

In the Irish War of Independence, he supported the use of the para-military Black and Tans to combat Irish revolutionaries. After British troops in Iraq clashed with Kurdish rebels, Churchill authorised two squadrons to the area, proposing that they be equipped with mustard gas to be used to "inflict punishment upon recalcitrant natives without inflicting grave injury upon them", although this was never implemented. More broadly, he saw the occupation of Iraq as a drain on Britain and proposed, unsuccessfully, that the government should hand control of central and northern Iraq back to Turkey.

Secretary of State for the Colonies: 1921–1922
 
Churchill became Secretary of State for the Colonies in February 1921. The following month, the first exhibit of his paintings was held; it took place in Paris, with Churchill exhibiting under a pseudonym. In May, his mother died; followed in August by his two-year-old daughter Marigold who succumbed to septicaemia. Marigold's death devastated her parents and Churchill was haunted by the tragedy for the rest of his life.

Churchill was involved in negotiations with Sinn Féin leaders and helped draft the Anglo-Irish Treaty. Elsewhere, he was responsible for reducing the cost of occupying the Middle East, and was involved in the installations of Faisal I of Iraq and his brother Abdullah I of Jordan. Churchill travelled to Mandatory Palestine where, as a supporter of Zionism, he refused an Arab Palestinian petition to prohibit Jewish migration to Palestine. He did allow some temporary restrictions following the 1921 Jaffa riots.

In September 1922, the Chanak Crisis erupted as Turkish forces threatened to occupy the Dardanelles neutral zone, which was policed by the British army based in Chanak (now Çanakkale). Churchill and Lloyd George favoured military resistance to any Turkish advance but the majority Conservatives in the coalition government opposed it. A political debacle ensued which resulted in the Conservative withdrawal from the government, precipitating the November 1922 general election.

Also in September, Churchill's fifth and last child, Mary, was born, and in the same month he purchased Chartwell, in Kent, which became his family home for the rest of his lifetime. In October 1922, he underwent an operation for appendicitis. While he was in hospital, Lloyd George's coalition was dissolved. In the general election, Churchill lost his Dundee seat  to Edwin Scrymgeour, a prohibitionist candidate. Later, he wrote that he was "without an office, without a seat, without a party, and without an appendix". Still, he could be satisfied with his elevation as one of 50 Companions of Honour, as named in Lloyd George's 1922 Dissolution Honours list.

Out of Parliament: 1922–1924

Churchill spent much of the next six months at the Villa Rêve d'Or near Cannes, where he devoted himself to painting and writing his memoirs. He wrote an autobiographical history of the war, The World Crisis. The first volume was published in April 1923 and the rest over the next ten years.

After the 1923 general election was called, seven Liberal associations asked Churchill to stand as their candidate, and he selected Leicester West, but he did not win the seat. A Labour government led by Ramsay MacDonald took power. Churchill had hoped they would be defeated by a Conservative-Liberal coalition. He strongly opposed the MacDonald government's decision to loan money to Soviet Russia and feared the signing of an Anglo-Soviet Treaty.

On 19 March 1924, alienated by Liberal support for Labour, Churchill stood as an independent anti-socialist candidate in the Westminster Abbey by-election but was defeated. In May, he addressed a Conservative meeting in Liverpool and declared that there was no longer a place for the Liberal Party in British politics. He said that Liberals must back the Conservatives to stop Labour and ensure "the successful defeat of socialism". In July, he agreed with Conservative leader Stanley Baldwin that he would be selected as a Conservative candidate in the next general election, which was held on 29 October. Churchill stood at Epping, but he described himself as a "Constitutionalist". The Conservatives were victorious and Baldwin formed the new government. Although Churchill had no background in finance or economics, Baldwin appointed him as Chancellor of the Exchequer.

Chancellor of the Exchequer: 1924–1929

Becoming Chancellor on 6 November 1924, Churchill formally rejoined the Conservative Party. As Chancellor, he intended to pursue his free trade principles in the form of laissez-faire economics, as under the Liberal social reforms. In April 1925, he controversially albeit reluctantly restored the gold standard in his first budget at its 1914 parity against the advice of some leading economists including John Maynard Keynes. The return to gold is held to have caused deflation and resultant unemployment with a devastating impact on the coal industry. Churchill presented five budgets in all to April 1929. Among his measures were reduction of the state pension age from 70 to 65; immediate provision of widow's pensions; reduction of military expenditure; income tax reductions and imposition of taxes on luxury items.

During the General Strike of 1926, Churchill edited the British Gazette, the government's anti-strike propaganda newspaper. After the strike ended, he acted as an intermediary between striking miners and their employers. He later called for the introduction of a legally binding minimum wage. In early 1927, Churchill visited Rome where he met Mussolini, whom he praised for his stand against Leninism.

The "Wilderness Years": 1929–1939

Marlborough and the India Question: 1929–1932

In the 1929 general election, Churchill retained his Epping seat but the Conservatives were defeated and MacDonald formed his second Labour government. Out of office, Churchill was prone to depression (his "black dog") as he sensed his political talents being wasted and time passing him by – in all such times, writing provided the antidote. He began work on Marlborough: His Life and Times, a four-volume biography of his ancestor John Churchill, 1st Duke of Marlborough. It was by this time that he had developed a reputation for being a heavy drinker of alcoholic beverages, although Jenkins believes that was often exaggerated.

Hoping that the Labour government could be ousted, he gained Baldwin's approval to work towards establishing a Conservative-Liberal coalition, although many Liberals were reluctant. In October 1930, after his return from a trip to North America, Churchill published his autobiography, My Early Life, which sold well and was translated into multiple languages.

In January 1931, Churchill resigned from the Conservative Shadow Cabinet because Baldwin supported the decision of the Labour government to grant Dominion status to India. Churchill believed that enhanced home rule status would hasten calls for full independence. He was particularly opposed to Mohandas Gandhi, whom he considered "a seditious Middle Temple lawyer, now posing as a fakir". His views enraged Labour and Liberal opinion although he was supported by many grassroot Conservatives.

The October 1931 general election was a landslide victory for the Conservatives Churchill nearly doubled his majority in Epping, but he was not given a ministerial position. The Commons debated Dominion Status for India on 3 December and Churchill insisted on dividing the House, but this backfired as only 43 MPs supported him. He embarked on a lecture tour of North America, hoping to recoup financial losses sustained in the Wall Street Crash. On 13 December, he was crossing Fifth Avenue in New York City when he was knocked down by a car, suffering a head wound from which he developed neuritis. To further his convalescence, he and Clementine took ship to Nassau for three weeks but Churchill became depressed there about his financial and political losses. He returned to America in late January 1932 and completed most of his lectures before arriving home on 18 March.

Having worked on Marlborough for much of 1932, Churchill in late August decided to visit his ancestor's battlefields. Staying at the Regina Hotel in Munich, he met Ernst Hanfstaengl, a friend of Hitler, who was then rising in prominence. Hanfstaengl tried to arrange a meeting between Churchill and Hitler, but Hitler was unenthusiastic: "What on earth would I talk to him about?" he asked. After Churchill raised concerns about Hitler's anti-Semitism, Hitler did not come to the hotel that day or the next. Hitler allegedly told Hanfstaengl that Churchill was not in office and was of no consequence. Soon after visiting Blenheim, Churchill was afflicted with paratyphoid fever and spent two weeks at a sanatorium in Salzburg. He returned to Chartwell on 25 September, still working on Marlborough. Two days later, he collapsed while walking in the grounds after a recurrence of paratyphoid which caused an ulcer to haemorrhage. He was taken to a London nursing home and remained there until late October.

Warnings about Germany and the abdication crisis: 1933–1936
After Hitler came to power on 30 January 1933, Churchill was quick to recognise the menace of such a regime and expressed alarm that the British government had reduced air force spending and warned that Germany would soon overtake Britain in air force production. Armed with official data provided clandestinely by two senior civil servants, Desmond Morton and Ralph Wigram, Churchill was able to speak with authority about what was happening in Germany, especially the development of the Luftwaffe. He told the people of his concerns in a radio broadcast in November 1934, having earlier denounced the intolerance and militarism of Nazism in the House of Commons. While Churchill regarded Mussolini's regime as a bulwark against the perceived threat of communist revolution, he opposed the Italian invasion of Ethiopia, despite describing the country as a primitive, uncivilised nation. Writing about the Spanish Civil War, he referred to Franco's army as the "anti-red movement", but later became critical of Franco. Two of his nephews, Esmond and Giles Romilly, fought as volunteers in the International Brigades in defence of the legitimate Republican government.

Between October 1933 and September 1938, the four volumes of Marlborough: His Life and Times were published and sold well. In December 1934, the India Bill entered Parliament and was passed in February 1935. Churchill and 83 other Conservative MPs voted against it. In June 1935, MacDonald resigned and was succeeded as Prime Minister by Baldwin. Baldwin then led the Conservatives to victory in the 1935 general election; Churchill retained his seat with an increased majority but was again left out of the government.

In January 1936, Edward VIII succeeded his father, George V, as monarch. His desire to marry an American divorcee, Wallis Simpson, caused the abdication crisis. Churchill supported Edward and clashed with Baldwin on the issue. Afterwards, although Churchill immediately pledged loyalty to George VI, he wrote that the abdication was "premature and probably quite unnecessary".

Anti-appeasement: 1937–1939

In May 1937, Baldwin resigned and was succeeded as Prime Minister by Neville Chamberlain. At first, Churchill welcomed Chamberlain's appointment but, in February 1938, matters came to a head after Foreign Secretary Anthony Eden resigned over Chamberlain's appeasement of Mussolini, a policy which Chamberlain was extending towards Hitler.

In 1938, Churchill warned the government against appeasement and called for collective action to deter German aggression. In March, the Evening Standard ceased publication of his fortnightly articles, but the Daily Telegraph published them instead. Following the German annexation of Austria, Churchill spoke in the House of Commons, declaring that "the gravity of the events[…] cannot be exaggerated"... 

He began calling for a mutual defence pact among European states threatened by German expansionism, arguing that this was the only way to halt Hitler. This was to no avail as, in September, Germany mobilised to invade the Sudetenland in Czechoslovakia. Churchill visited Chamberlain at Downing Street and urged him to tell Germany that Britain would declare war if the Germans invaded Czechoslovak territory; Chamberlain was not willing to do this. On 30 September, Chamberlain signed up to the Munich Agreement, agreeing to allow German annexation of the Sudetenland. Speaking in the House of Commons on 5 October, Churchill called the agreement "a total and unmitigated defeat". Following the final dismemberment of Czechoslovakia in March 1939, Churchill and his supporters called for the foundation of a national coalition. His popularity increased and people began to agitate for his return to office.

First Lord of the Admiralty: September 1939 to May 1940

The Phoney War and the Norwegian Campaign
On 3 September 1939, the day Britain declared war on Germany, Chamberlain reappointed Churchill as First Lord of the Admiralty and he joined Chamberlain's war cabinet. Churchill later claimed that the Board of the Admiralty sent a signal to the Fleet: "Winston is back". As First Lord, Churchill was one of the highest-profile ministers during the so-called "Phoney War", when the only significant action by British forces was at sea. Churchill was ebullient after the Battle of the River Plate on 13 December 1939 and afterwards welcomed home the crews, congratulating them on "a brilliant sea fight" and saying that their actions in a cold, dark winter had "warmed the cockles of the British heart". These actions, supplemented by his speeches, considerably enhanced Churchill's reputation.

He was concerned about German naval activity in the Baltic Sea and initially wanted to send a naval force there but this was soon changed to a plan, codenamed Operation Wilfred, to mine Norwegian waters and stop iron ore shipments from Narvik to Germany. There were disagreements about mining, both in the war cabinet and with the French government. As a result, Wilfred was delayed until 8 April 1940, the day before the German invasion of Norway was launched.

The Norway Debate and Chamberlain's resignation

After the Allies failed to prevent the German occupation of Norway, the Commons held an open debate from 7 to 9 May on the government's conduct of the war. This has come to be known as the Norway Debate and is renowned as one of the most significant events in parliamentary history. On the second day (Wednesday, 8 May), the Labour opposition called for a division which was in effect a vote of no confidence in Chamberlain's government. There was considerable support for Churchill on both sides of the House but, as a member of the government, he was obliged to speak on its behalf. He was called upon to wind up the debate, which placed him in the difficult position of having to defend the government without damaging his own prestige. Although the government won the vote, its majority was drastically reduced amid calls for a national government to be formed.

In the early hours of 10 May, German forces invaded Belgium, Luxembourg and the Netherlands as a prelude to their assault on France. Since the division vote, Chamberlain had been trying to form a coalition but Labour declared on the Friday afternoon that they would not serve under his leadership, although they would accept another Conservative. The only two candidates were Churchill and Lord Halifax, the Foreign Secretary. The matter had already been discussed at a meeting on the 9th between Chamberlain, Halifax, Churchill, and David Margesson, the government Chief Whip. Halifax admitted that he could not govern effectively as a member of the House of Lords and so Chamberlain advised the King to send for Churchill, who became Prime Minister. Churchill later wrote of feeling a profound sense of relief in that he now had authority over the whole scene. He believed himself to be walking with destiny and that his life so far had been "a preparation for this hour and for this trial".

Prime Minister: 1940–1945

Dunkirk to Pearl Harbor: May 1940 to December 1941

War ministry created

In May, Churchill was still generally unpopular with many Conservatives and probably most of the Labour Party. Chamberlain remained Conservative Party leader until October when ill health forced his resignation. By that time, Churchill had won the doubters over and his succession as party leader was a formality.

He began his premiership by forming a five-man war cabinet which included Chamberlain as Lord President of the Council, Labour leader Clement Attlee as Lord Privy Seal (later as Deputy Prime Minister), Halifax as Foreign Secretary and Labour's Arthur Greenwood as a minister without portfolio. In practice, these five were augmented by the service chiefs and ministers who attended the majority of meetings. The cabinet changed in size and membership as the war progressed, one of the key appointments being the leading trades unionist Ernest Bevin as Minister of Labour and National Service. In response to previous criticisms that there had been no clear single minister in charge of the prosecution of the war, Churchill created and assumed the additional position of Minister of Defence, making him the most powerful wartime Prime Minister in British history. He drafted outside experts into government to fulfil vital functions, especially on the Home Front. These included personal friends like Lord Beaverbrook and Frederick Lindemann, who became the government's scientific advisor.

Resolve to fight on

At the end of May, with the British Expeditionary Force in retreat to Dunkirk and the Fall of France seemingly imminent, Halifax proposed that the government should explore the possibility of a negotiated peace settlement using the still-neutral Mussolini as an intermediary. There were several high-level meetings from 26 to 28 May, including two with the French premier Paul Reynaud. Churchill's resolve was to fight on, even if France capitulated, but his position remained precarious until Chamberlain resolved to support him. Churchill had the full support of the two Labour members but knew he could not survive as Prime Minister if both Chamberlain and Halifax were against him. In the end, by gaining the support of his outer cabinet, Churchill outmanoeuvred Halifax and won Chamberlain over. Churchill believed that the only option was to fight on and his use of rhetoric hardened public opinion against a peaceful resolution and prepared the British people for a long war – Jenkins says Churchill's speeches were "an inspiration for the nation, and a catharsis for Churchill himself".

Churchill succeeded as an orator despite being handicapped from childhood with a speech impediment. He had a lateral lisp and was unable to pronounce the letter s, verbalising it with a slur. He worked hard on his pronunciation by repeating phrases designed to cure his problem with the sibilant "s". He was ultimately successful and was eventually able to say: "My impediment is no hindrance". In time, he turned the impediment into an asset and could use it to great effect, as when he called Hitler a "Nar-zee" (rhymes with "khazi"; emphasis on the "z"), rather than a Nazi ("ts").

His first speech as Prime Minister, delivered to the Commons on 13 May was the "blood, toil, tears and sweat" speech. It was little more than a short statement but, Jenkins says, "it included phrases which have reverberated down the decades". Churchill made it plain to the nation that a long, hard road lay ahead and that victory was the final goal:

Operation Dynamo and the Battle of France
Operation Dynamo, the evacuation of 338,226 Allied servicemen from Dunkirk, ended on Tuesday, 4 June when the French rearguard surrendered. The total was far in excess of expectations and it gave rise to a popular view that Dunkirk had been a miracle, and even a victory. Churchill himself referred to "a miracle of deliverance" in his "we shall fight on the beaches" speech to the Commons that afternoon, though he shortly reminded everyone that: "We must be very careful not to assign to this deliverance the attributes of a victory. Wars are not won by evacuations". The speech ended on a note of defiance coupled with a clear appeal to the United States:

Germany initiated Fall Rot the following day and Italy entered the war on the 10th. The Wehrmacht occupied Paris on the 14th and completed their conquest of France on 25 June. It was now inevitable that Hitler would attack and probably try to invade Great Britain. Faced with this, Churchill addressed the Commons on 18 June and delivered one of his most famous speeches, ending with this peroration:

Churchill was determined to fight back and ordered the commencement of the Western Desert campaign on 11 June, an immediate response to the Italian declaration of war. This went well at first while the Italian army was the sole opposition and Operation Compass was a noted success. In early 1941, however, Mussolini requested German support and Hitler sent the Afrika Korps to Tripoli under the command of Generalleutnant Erwin Rommel, who arrived not long after Churchill had halted Compass so that he could reassign forces to Greece where the Balkans campaign was entering a critical phase.

In other initiatives through June and July 1940, Churchill ordered the formation of both the Special Operations Executive (SOE) and the Commandos. The SOE was ordered to promote and execute subversive activity in Nazi-occupied Europe while the Commandos were charged with raids on specific military targets there. Hugh Dalton, the Minister of Economic Warfare, took political responsibility for the SOE and recorded in his diary that Churchill told him: "And now go and set Europe ablaze".

The Battle of Britain and the Blitz

On 20 August 1940, at the height of the Battle of Britain, Churchill addressed the Commons to outline the war situation. In the middle of this speech, he made a statement that created a famous nickname for the RAF fighter pilots involved in the battle:

The Luftwaffe altered its strategy from 7 September 1940 and began the Blitz, which was especially intensive through October and November. Churchill's morale during the Blitz was generally high and he told his private secretary John Colville in November that he thought the threat of invasion was past. He was confident that Great Britain could hold its own, given the increase in output, but was realistic about its chances of actually winning the war without American intervention.

Lend-Lease
In September 1940, the British and American governments concluded the Destroyers for Bases Agreement, by which fifty American destroyers were transferred to the Royal Navy in exchange for free US base rights in Bermuda, the Caribbean and Newfoundland. An added advantage for Britain was that its military assets in those bases could be redeployed elsewhere.

Churchill's good relations with United States President Franklin D. Roosevelt helped secure vital food, oil and munitions via the North Atlantic shipping routes. It was for this reason that Churchill was relieved when Roosevelt was re-elected in 1940. Upon re-election, Roosevelt set about implementing a new method of providing necessities to Great Britain without the need for monetary payment. He persuaded Congress that repayment for this immensely costly service would take the form of defending the US. The policy was known as Lend-Lease and it was formally enacted on 11 March 1941.

Operation Barbarossa

Hitler launched his invasion of the Soviet Union on Sunday, 22 June 1941. It was no surprise to Churchill, who had known since early April, from Enigma decrypts at Bletchley Park, that the attack was imminent. He had tried to warn General Secretary Joseph Stalin via the British ambassador to Moscow, Stafford Cripps, but to no avail as Stalin did not trust Churchill. The night before the attack, already intending an address to the nation, Churchill alluded to his hitherto anti-communist views by saying to Colville: "If Hitler invaded Hell, I would at least make a favourable reference to the Devil".

Atlantic Charter
In August 1941, Churchill made his first transatlantic crossing of the war on board  and met Roosevelt in Placentia Bay, Newfoundland. On 14 August, they issued the joint statement that has become known as the Atlantic Charter. This outlined the goals of both countries for the future of the world and it is seen as the inspiration for the 1942 Declaration by United Nations, itself the basis of the United Nations which was founded in June 1945.

Pearl Harbor to D-Day: December 1941 to June 1944

Pearl Harbor and United States entry into the war
On 7–8 December 1941, the Japanese attack on Pearl Harbor was followed by their invasion of Malaya and, on the 8th, Churchill declared war on Japan. Three days later came the joint declaration of war by Germany and Italy against the United States. Churchill went to Washington later in the month to meet Roosevelt for the first Washington Conference (codename Arcadia). This was important for "Europe First", the decision to prioritise victory in Europe over victory in the Pacific, taken by Roosevelt while Churchill was still in mid-Atlantic. The Americans agreed with Churchill that Hitler was the main enemy and that the defeat of Germany was key to Allied success. It was also agreed that the first joint Anglo-American strike would be Operation Torch, the invasion of French North Africa (i.e., Algeria and Morocco). Originally planned for the spring of 1942, it was finally launched in November 1942 when the crucial Second Battle of El Alamein was already underway.

On 26 December, Churchill addressed a joint meeting of the US Congress but, that night, he suffered a mild heart attack which was diagnosed by his physician, Sir Charles Wilson (later Lord Moran), as a coronary deficiency needing several weeks' bed rest. Churchill insisted that he did not need bed rest and, two days later, journeyed on to Ottawa by train where he gave a speech to the Canadian Parliament that included the "some chicken, some neck" line in which he recalled French predictions in 1940 that "Britain alone would have her neck wrung like a chicken". He arrived home in mid-January, having flown from Bermuda to Plymouth in an American flying boat, to find that there was a crisis of confidence in both his coalition government and himself personally, and he decided to face a vote of confidence in the Commons, which he won easily.

While he was away, the Eighth Army, having already relieved the Siege of Tobruk, had pursued Operation Crusader against Rommel's forces in Libya, successfully driving them back to a defensive position at El Agheila in Cyrenaica. On 21 January 1942, however, Rommel launched a surprise counter-attack which drove the Allies back to Gazala.

Elsewhere, recent British success in the Battle of the Atlantic was compromised by the Kriegsmarine's introduction of its M4 4-rotor Enigma, whose signals could not be deciphered by Bletchley Park for nearly a year. In the Far East, the news was much worse with Japanese advances in all theatres, especially at sea and in Malaya. At a press conference in Washington, Churchill had to play down his increasing doubts about the security of Singapore.

Fall of Singapore, loss of Burma and the Bengal famine
Churchill already had grave concerns about the fighting quality of British troops after the defeats in Norway, France, Greece and Crete. Following the fall of Singapore to the Japanese on 15 February 1942, he felt that his misgivings were confirmed and said: "(this is) the worst disaster and largest capitulation in British military history". More bad news had come on 11 February as the Kriegsmarine pulled off its audacious "Channel Dash", a massive blow to British naval prestige. The combined effect of these events was to sink Churchill's morale to its lowest point of the whole war.

Meanwhile, the Japanese had occupied most of Burma by the end of April 1942. Counter-offensives were hampered by the monsoon season and by disordered conditions in Bengal and Bihar, as well as a severe cyclone which devastated the region in October 1942. A combination of factors, including the curtailment of essential rice imports from Burma, poor administration, wartime inflation and a series of large-scale natural disasters such as flooding and crop disease led to the Bengal famine of 1943, in which an estimated 2.1–3.8 million people died. From December 1942 onwards, food shortages had prompted senior officials in India to ask London for grain imports, although the colonial authorities failed to recognise the seriousness of the emerging famine and responded ineptly. Churchill's government was criticised for refusing to approve more imports, a policy it ascribed to an acute wartime shortage of shipping. When the British realised the full extent of the famine in September 1943, Churchill ordered the transportation of 130,000 tons of Iraqi and Australian grain to Bengal and the war cabinet agreed to send 200,000 tons by the end of the year. During the last quarter of 1943, 100,000 tons of rice and 176,000 tons of wheat were imported, compared to averages of 55,000 tons of rice and 54,000 tons of wheat earlier in the year. In October, Churchill wrote to the newly appointed Viceroy of India, Lord Wavell, charging him with the responsibility of ending the famine. In February 1944, as preparation for Operation Overlord placed greater demands on Allied shipping, Churchill cabled Wavell saying: "I will certainly help you all I can, but you must not ask the impossible". Grain shipment requests continued to be turned down by the government throughout 1944, and Wavell complained to Churchill in October that "the vital problems of India are being treated by His Majesty's Government with neglect, even sometimes with hostility and contempt". The relative impact of British policies on the death toll of the famine remains a matter of controversy among scholars.

International conferences in 1942

On 20 May 1942, the Soviet Foreign Affairs minister, Vyacheslav Molotov, arrived in London and stayed until the 28th before going on to Washington. The purpose of this visit was to sign a treaty of friendship but Molotov wanted it done on the basis of certain territorial concessions regarding Poland and the Baltic countries. Churchill and Eden worked for a compromise and eventually a twenty-year treaty was formalised but with the question of frontiers placed on hold. Molotov was also seeking a Second Front in Europe but all Churchill could do was confirm that preparations were in progress and make no promises on a date.

Churchill felt well pleased with these negotiations and said as much when he contacted Roosevelt on the 27th. The previous day, however, Rommel had launched his counter-offensive, Operation Venice, to begin the Battle of Gazala. The Allies were ultimately driven out of Libya and suffered a major defeat in the loss of Tobruk on 21 June. Churchill was with Roosevelt when the news of Tobruk reached him. He was shocked by the surrender of 35,000 troops which was, apart from Singapore, "the heaviest blow" he received in the war. The Axis advance was eventually halted at the First Battle of El Alamein in July and the Battle of Alam el Halfa in early September. Both sides were exhausted and in urgent need of reinforcements and supplies.

Churchill had returned to Washington on 17 June. He and Roosevelt agreed on the implementation of Operation Torch as the necessary precursor to an invasion of Europe. Roosevelt had appointed General Dwight D. Eisenhower as commanding officer of the European Theater of Operations, United States Army (ETOUSA). Having received the news from North Africa, Churchill obtained shipment from America to the Eighth Army of 300 Sherman tanks and 100 howitzers. He returned to Britain on 25 June and had to face another motion of no confidence, this time in his central direction of the war, but again he won easily.

In August, despite health concerns, Churchill visited the British forces in North Africa, raising morale in the process, en route to Moscow for his first meeting with Stalin. He was accompanied by Roosevelt's special envoy Averell Harriman. He was in Moscow 12–16 August and had four lengthy meetings with Stalin. Although they got along quite well together on a personal level, there was little chance of any real progress given the state of the war with the Germans still advancing in all theatres. Stalin was desperate for the Allies to open the Second Front in Europe, as Churchill had discussed with Molotov in May, and the answer was the same.

Turn of the tide: El Alamein and Stalingrad
While he was in Cairo in early August, Churchill decided to appoint Field Marshal Alexander as Field Marshal Auchinleck's successor as Commander-in-Chief of the Middle East Theatre. Command of the Eighth Army was given to General William Gott but he was shot down and killed while flying to Cairo, only three days later and General Montgomery succeeded him. Churchill returned to Cairo from Moscow on 17 August and could see for himself that the Alexander/Montgomery combination was already having an effect. He returned to England on the 21st, nine days before Rommel launched his final offensive.

As 1942 drew to a close, the tide of war began to turn with Allied victory in the key battles of El Alamein and Stalingrad. Until November, the Allies had always been on the defensive, but from November, the Germans were. Churchill ordered the church bells to be rung throughout Great Britain for the first time since early 1940. On 10 November, knowing that El Alamein was a victory, he delivered one of his most memorable war speeches to the Lord Mayor's Luncheon at the Mansion House in London, in response to the Allied victory at El Alamein: "This is not the end. It is not even the beginning of the end. But it is, perhaps, the end of the beginning".

International conferences in 1943

In January 1943, Churchill met Roosevelt at the Casablanca Conference (codename Symbol), which lasted ten days. It was also attended by General Charles de Gaulle on behalf of the Free French Forces. Stalin had hoped to attend but declined because of the situation at Stalingrad. Although Churchill expressed doubts on the matter, the so-called Casablanca Declaration committed the Allies to securing "unconditional surrender" by the Axis powers. From Morocco, Churchill went to Cairo, Adana, Cyprus, Cairo again and Algiers for various purposes. He arrived home on 7 February having been out of the country for nearly a month. He addressed the Commons on the 11th and then became seriously ill with pneumonia the following day, necessitating more than one month of rest, recuperation and convalescence – for the latter, he moved to Chequers. He returned to work in London on 15 March.

Churchill made two transatlantic crossings during the year, meeting Roosevelt at both the third Washington Conference (codename Trident) in May and the first Quebec Conference (codename Quadrant) in August. In November, Churchill and Roosevelt met Chinese Generalissimo Chiang Kai-shek at the Cairo Conference (codename Sextant).

The most important conference of the year was soon afterwards (28 November to 1 December) at Tehran (codename Eureka), where Churchill and Roosevelt met Stalin in the first of the "Big Three" meetings, preceding those at Yalta and Potsdam in 1945. Roosevelt and Stalin co-operated in persuading Churchill to commit to the opening of a second front in western Europe and it was also agreed that Germany would be divided after the war, but no firm decisions were made about how. On their way back from Tehran, Churchill and Roosevelt held a second Cairo conference with Turkish president İsmet İnönü, but were unable to gain any commitment from Turkey to join the Allies.

Churchill went from Cairo to Tunis, arriving on 10 December, initially as Eisenhower's guest (soon afterwards, Eisenhower took over as Supreme Allied Commander of the new SHAEF just being created in London). While Churchill was in Tunis, he became seriously ill with atrial fibrillation and was forced to remain until after Christmas while a succession of specialists were drafted in to ensure his recovery. Clementine and Colville arrived to keep him company; Colville had just returned to Downing Street after more than two years in the RAF. On 27 December, the party went on to Marrakesh for convalescence. He was back in London on the morning of 18 January and surprised MPs by attending Prime Minister's Questions in the Commons that afternoon. Since 12 January 1943, when he set off for the Casablanca Conference, Churchill had been abroad or seriously ill for 203 of the 371 days.

Invasions of Sicily and Italy

In the autumn of 1942, after Churchill's meeting with Stalin in Moscow, he was approached by Eisenhower, commanding the North African Theater of Operations, United States Army (NATOUSA), and his aides on the subject of where the Western Allies should launch their first strike in Europe. According to General Mark Clark, who later commanded the United States Fifth Army in the Italian campaign, the Americans openly admitted that a cross-Channel operation in the near future was "utterly impossible". As an alternative, Churchill recommended "slit(ting) the soft belly of the Mediterranean" and persuaded them to invade first Sicily and then Italy after they had defeated the Afrika Korps in North Africa. After the war, Clark still agreed that Churchill's analysis was correct but he added that, when the Allies landed at Salerno, they found that Italy was "a tough old gut".

The invasion of Sicily began on 9 July and was successfully completed by 17 August. Churchill was then all for driving straight up the Italian mainland with Rome as the main target, but the Americans wanted to withdraw several divisions to England in the build-up of forces for Operation Overlord, now scheduled for the spring of 1944. Churchill was still not keen on Overlord as he feared that an Anglo-American army in France might not be a match for the fighting efficiency of the Wehrmacht. He preferred peripheral operations, including a plan called Operation Jupiter for an invasion of northern Norway. Events in Sicily had an unexpected impact in Italy. King Victor Emmanuel sacked Mussolini on 25 July and appointed Marshal Badoglio as Prime Minister. Badoglio opened negotiations with the Allies which resulted in the Armistice of Cassibile on 3 September. In response, the Germans activated Operation Achse and took control of most of Italy. Although he still preferred Italy to Normandy as the Allies' main route into the Third Reich, Churchill was deeply concerned about the strong German resistance at Salerno and, later, after the Allies successfully gained their bridgehead at Anzio but still failed to break the stalemate, he caustically said that instead of "hurling a wildcat onto the shore", the Allied force had become a "stranded whale".  The big obstacle was Monte Cassino and it was not until mid-May 1944 when it was finally overcome, enabling the Allies to at last advance on Rome, which was taken on 4 June.

Preparations for D-Day

The difficulties in Italy caused Churchill to have a change of heart and mind about Allied strategy to the extent that, when the Anzio stalemate developed soon after his return to England from North Africa, he threw himself into the planning of Overlord and set up an ongoing series of meetings with SHAEF and the British Chiefs of Staff over which he regularly presided. These were always attended by either Eisenhower or his chief of staff General Walter Bedell Smith. Churchill was especially taken by the Mulberry project but he was also keen to make the most of Allied air power which, by the beginning of 1944, had become overwhelming. Churchill never fully lost his apprehension about the invasion, however, and underwent great fluctuation of mood as D-Day approached. Jenkins says that he faced potential victory with much less buoyancy than when he defiantly faced the prospect of defeat four years earlier.

Need for post-war reform
Churchill could not ignore the need for post-war reforms covering a broad sweep of areas such as agriculture, education, employment, health, housing and welfare. The Beveridge Report with its five "Giant Evils" was published in November 1942 and assumed great importance amid widespread popular acclaim. Even so, Churchill was not really interested because he was focused on winning the war and saw reform in terms of tidying up afterwards. His attitude was demonstrated in a Sunday evening radio broadcast on 26 March 1944. He was obliged to devote most of it to the subject of reform and showed a distinct lack of interest. In their respective diaries, Colville said Churchill had broadcast "indifferently" and Harold Nicolson said that, to many people, Churchill came across the air as "a worn and petulant old man".

In the end, however, it was the population's demand for reform that decided the 1945 general election. Labour was perceived as the party that would deliver Beveridge. Arthur Greenwood had initiated its preceding social insurance and allied services inquiry in June 1941. Attlee, Bevin and Labour's other coalition ministers through the war were seen to be working towards reform and earned the trust of the electorate.

Defeat of Germany: June 1944 to May 1945

D-Day: Allied invasion of Normandy
Churchill was determined to be actively involved in the Normandy invasion and hoped to cross the Channel on D-Day itself (6 June 1944) or at least on D-Day+1. His desire caused unnecessary consternation at SHAEF until he was effectively vetoed by the King who told Churchill that, as head of all three services, he (the King) ought to go too. Churchill expected an Allied death toll of 20,000 on D-Day but he was proven to be pessimistic because less than 8,000 died in the whole of June. He made his first visit to Normandy on 12 June to visit Montgomery, whose HQ was then about five miles inland. That evening, as he was returning to London, the first V-1 flying bombs were launched. In a longer visit to Normandy on 22–23 July, Churchill went to Cherbourg and Arromanches where he saw the Mulberry Harbour.

Quebec Conference, September 1944
Churchill met Roosevelt at the Second Quebec Conference (codename Octagon) from 12 to 16 September 1944. Between themselves, they reached agreement on the Morgenthau Plan for the Allied occupation of Germany after the war, the intention of which was not only to demilitarise but also de-industrialise Germany. Eden strongly opposed it and was later able to persuade Churchill to disown it. US Secretary of State Cordell Hull also opposed it and convinced Roosevelt that it was infeasible.

Moscow Conference, October 1944
At the fourth Moscow conference (codename Tolstoy) from 9 to 19 October 1944, Churchill and Eden met Stalin and Molotov. This conference has gained notoriety for the so-called "Percentages agreement" in which Churchill and Stalin effectively agreed the post-war fate of the Balkans. By that time, the Soviet armies were in Rumania and Bulgaria. Churchill suggested a scale of predominance throughout the whole region so as not to, as he put it, "get at cross-purposes in small ways". He wrote down some suggested percentages of influence per country and gave it to Stalin who ticked it. The agreement was that Russia would have 90% control of Romania and 75% control of Bulgaria. The UK and the USA would have 90% control of Greece. Hungary and Yugoslavia would be 50% each. In 1958, five years after the account of this meeting was published (in Churchill's The Second World War), Soviet authorities denied that Stalin had accepted such an "imperialist proposal".

Yalta Conference, February 1945

From 30 January to 2 February 1945, Churchill and Roosevelt met for their Malta Conference ahead of the second "Big Three" event at Yalta from 4 to 11 February. Yalta had massive implications for the post-war world. There were two predominant issues: the question of setting up the United Nations Organisation after the war, on which much progress was made; and the more vexed question of Poland's post-war status, which Churchill saw as a test case for the future of Eastern Europe. Churchill faced some strong criticism for the Yalta agreement on Poland. For example, 27 Tory MPs voted against him when the matter was debated in the Commons at the end of the month. Jenkins, however, maintains that Churchill did as well as he could have done in very difficult circumstances, not least the fact that Roosevelt was seriously ill and could not provide Churchill with meaningful support.

Another outcome of Yalta was the so-called Operation Keelhaul. The Western Allies agreed to the forcible repatriation of all Soviet citizens in the Allied zones, including prisoners of war, to the Soviet Union and the policy was later extended to all Eastern European refugees, many of whom were anti-Communist. Keelhaul was implemented between 14 August 1946 and 9 May 1947.

Area bombing controversy

On the nights of 13–15 February 1945, some 1,200 British and US bombers attacked the German city of Dresden, which was crowded with wounded and refugees from the Eastern Front. The attacks were part of an area bombing campaign that was initiated by Churchill in January with the intention of shortening the war. Churchill came to regret the bombing because initial reports suggested an excessive number of civilian casualties close to the end of the war, though an independent commission in 2010 confirmed a death toll between 22,700 and 25,000. On 28 March, he decided to restrict area bombing and sent a memorandum to General Ismay for the Chiefs of Staff Committee:

British historian Frederick Taylor has pointed out that the number of Soviet citizens who died from German bombing was roughly equivalent to the number of German citizens who died from Allied raids. Jenkins asks if Churchill was moved more by foreboding than by regret but admits it is easy to criticise with the hindsight of victory. He adds that the area bombing campaign was no more reprehensible than President Truman's use of the second atomic bomb on Nagasaki six months later. Andrew Marr, quoting Max Hastings, says that Churchill's memorandum was a "calculated political attempt..... to distance himself..... from the rising controversy surrounding the area offensive".

VE Day (Victory in Europe Day)

On 7 May 1945 at the SHAEF headquarters in Reims the Allies accepted Germany's surrender. The next day was Victory in Europe Day (VE Day) when Churchill broadcast to the nation that Germany had surrendered and that a final ceasefire on all fronts in Europe would come into effect at one minute past midnight that night (i.e., on the 9th). Afterwards, Churchill went to Buckingham Palace where he appeared on the balcony with the Royal Family before a huge crowd of celebrating citizens. He went from the palace to Whitehall where he addressed another large crowd: "God bless you all. This is your victory. In our long history, we have never seen a greater day than this. Everyone, man or woman, has done their best".

At this point he asked Ernest Bevin to come forward and share the applause. Bevin said: "No, Winston, this is your day", and proceeded to conduct the people in the singing of For He's a Jolly Good Fellow. In the evening, Churchill made another broadcast to the nation asserting that the defeat of Japan would follow in the coming months (the Japanese surrendered on 15 August 1945).

Caretaker government: May 1945 to July 1945

With a general election looming (there had been none for almost a decade), and with the Labour ministers refusing to continue the wartime coalition, Churchill resigned as Prime Minister on 23 May 1945. Later that day, he accepted the King's invitation to form a new government, known officially as the National Government, like the Conservative-dominated coalition of the 1930s, but sometimes called the caretaker ministry. It contained Conservatives, National Liberals and a few non-party figures such as Sir John Anderson and Lord Woolton, but not Labour or Archibald Sinclair's Official Liberals. Although Churchill continued to carry out the functions of Prime Minister, including exchanging messages with the US administration about the upcoming Potsdam Conference, he was not formally reappointed until 28 May.

Potsdam Conference

Churchill was Great Britain's representative at the post-war Potsdam Conference when it opened on 17 July and was accompanied at its sessions not only by Eden as Foreign Secretary but also, pending the result of the July general election, by Attlee. They attended nine sessions in nine days before returning to England for their election counts. After the landslide Labour victory, Attlee returned with Bevin as the new Foreign Secretary and there were a further five days of discussion. Potsdam went badly for Churchill. Eden later described his performance as "appalling", saying that he was unprepared and verbose. Churchill upset the Chinese, exasperated the Americans and was easily led by Stalin, whom he was supposed to be resisting.

General election, July 1945

Churchill mishandled the election campaign by resorting to party politics and trying to denigrate Labour. On 4 June, he committed a serious political gaffe by saying in a radio broadcast that a Labour government would require "some form of Gestapo" to enforce its agenda. It backfired badly and Attlee made political capital by saying in his reply broadcast next day: "The voice we heard last night was that of Mr Churchill, but the mind was that of Lord Beaverbrook". Jenkins says that this broadcast was "the making of Attlee".

Although polling day was 5 July, the results of the election did not become known until 26 July, owing to the need to collect the votes of those serving overseas. Clementine and daughter Mary had been at the count in Woodford, Churchill's new constituency in Essex, and had returned to Downing Street to meet him for lunch. Churchill was unopposed by the major parties in Woodford, but his majority over a sole independent candidate was much less than expected. He now anticipated defeat by Labour and Mary later described the lunch as "an occasion of Stygian gloom". To Clementine's suggestion that election defeat might be "a blessing in disguise", Churchill retorted: "At the moment it seems very effectively disguised".

That afternoon Churchill's doctor Lord Moran (so he later recorded in his book The Struggle for Survival) commiserated with him on the "ingratitude" of the British public, to which Churchill replied: "I wouldn't call it that. They have had a very hard time". Having lost the election, despite enjoying much personal support amongst the British population, he resigned as Prime Minister that evening and was succeeded by Attlee who formed the first majority Labour government. Many reasons have been given for Churchill's defeat, key among them being that a desire for post-war reform was widespread amongst the population and that the man who had led Britain in war was not seen as the man to lead the nation in peace. Although the Conservative Party was unpopular, many electors appear to have wanted Churchill to continue as Prime Minister whatever the outcome, or to have wrongly believed that this would be possible.

Leader of the Opposition: 1945–1951

"Iron Curtain" speech

Churchill continued to lead the Conservative Party and, for six years, served as Leader of the Opposition. In 1946, he was in America for nearly three months from early January to late March. It was on this trip that he gave his "Iron Curtain" speech about the USSR and its creation of the Eastern Bloc. Speaking on 5 March 1946 in the company of President Truman at Westminster College in Fulton, Missouri, Churchill declared:

The essence of his view was that, though the Soviet Union did not want war with the western Allies, its entrenched position in Eastern Europe had made it impossible for the three great powers to provide the world with a "triangular leadership". Churchill's desire was much closer collaboration between Britain and America. Within the same speech, he called for "a special relationship between the British Commonwealth and Empire and the United States", but he emphasised the need for co-operation within the framework of the United Nations Charter.

Politics
Churchill was an early proponent of pan-Europeanism, having called for a "United States of Europe" in a 1930 article. He supported the creations of the Council of Europe in 1949 and the European Coal and Steel Community in 1951, but his support was always with the firm proviso that Britain must not actually join any federal grouping.

Having lived in Ireland as a child, Churchill always opposed its partition. As a minister in 1913 and again in 1921, he suggested that Ulster should be part of a united Ireland, but with a degree of autonomy from an independent Irish government. He was always opposed on this by Ulster Unionists. While he was Leader of the Opposition, he told John W. Dulanty and Frederick Boland, successive Irish ambassadors to London, that he still hoped for reunification.

Labour won the 1950 general election, but with a much-reduced majority. Churchill continued to serve as Leader of the Opposition.

Prime Minister: 1951–1955

Election result and cabinet appointments

Despite losing the popular vote to Labour, the Conservatives won an overall majority of 17 seats in the October 1951 general election and Churchill again became Prime Minister, remaining in office until his resignation on 5 April 1955. Eden, his eventual successor, was restored to Foreign Affairs, the portfolio with which Churchill was preoccupied throughout his tenure. Future Prime Minister Harold Macmillan was appointed Minister of Housing and Local Government with a manifesto commitment to build 300,000 new houses per annum, Churchill's only real domestic concern. He achieved the target and, in October 1954, was promoted to Minister of Defence.

Health issues to eventual resignation
Churchill was nearly 77 when he took office and was not in good health following several minor strokes. By December, George VI had become concerned about Churchill's decline and intended asking him to stand down in favour of Eden, but the King had his own serious health issues and died on 6 February without making the request. Churchill developed a close friendship with Elizabeth II and, in the spring of 1953, he accepted the Order of the Garter at her request. He was knighted as Sir Winston on 24 April 1953. It was widely expected that he would retire after the Queen's Coronation in June 1953 but, after Eden became seriously ill, Churchill increased his own responsibilities by taking over at the Foreign Office. Eden was incapacitated until the end of the year and was never completely well again.

On the evening of 23 June 1953, Churchill suffered a serious stroke and became partially paralysed down one side. Had Eden been well, Churchill's premiership would most likely have been over. The matter was kept secret and Churchill went home to Chartwell to recuperate. He had fully recovered by November. He retired as Prime Minister in April 1955 and was succeeded by Eden.

Foreign affairs

Churchill feared a global conflagration and firmly believed that the only way to preserve peace and freedom was to build on a solid foundation of friendship and co-operation between Britain and America. He made four official transatlantic visits from January 1952 to July 1954.

He enjoyed a good relationship with Truman but difficulties arose over the planned European Defence Community (EDC), by which Truman hoped to reduce America's military presence in West Germany; Churchill was sceptical about the EDC. Churchill wanted US military support of British interests in Egypt and the Middle East, but that was refused. While Truman expected British military involvement in Korea, he viewed any US commitment to the Middle East as maintaining British imperialism. The Americans recognised that the British Empire was in terminal decline and had welcomed the Attlee government's policy of decolonisation. Churchill believed that Britain's position as a world power depended on the empire's continued existence.

Churchill had been obliged to recognise Colonel Nasser's revolutionary government of Egypt, which took power in 1952. Much to Churchill's private dismay, agreement was reached in October 1954 on the phased evacuation of British troops from their Suez base. In addition, Britain agreed to terminate its rule in Anglo-Egyptian Sudan by 1956, though this was in return for Nasser's abandonment of Egyptian claims over the region. Elsewhere, the Malayan Emergency, a guerrilla war fought by Communist fighters against Commonwealth forces, had begun in 1948 and continued past Malayan independence (1957) until 1960. Churchill's government maintained the military response to the crisis and adopted a similar strategy for the Mau Mau Uprising in British Kenya (1952–1960).

Churchill was uneasy about the election of Eisenhower as Truman's successor. After Stalin died on 5 March 1953, Churchill sought a summit meeting with the Soviets but Eisenhower refused out of fear that the Soviets would use it for propaganda. By July of that year, Churchill was deeply regretting that the Democrats had not been returned. He told Colville that Eisenhower as president was "both weak and stupid". Churchill believed that Eisenhower did not fully comprehend the danger posed by the H-bomb and he greatly distrusted Eisenhower's Secretary of State, John Foster Dulles. Churchill hosted Eisenhower to no avail at the Three-Powers Bermuda Conference (with French Prime Minister Joseph Laniel being the third participant) in December 1953; they met again in June/July 1954 at the White House. In the end, it was the Soviets who proposed a four-power summit, but it did not meet until 18 July 1955, three months after Churchill had retired.

Later life: 1955–1965

Retirement: 1955–1964
Elizabeth II offered to create Churchill Duke of London, but he declined because of the objections of his son Randolph, who would have inherited the title on his father's death. Although publicly supportive, Churchill was privately scathing about Eden's handling of the Suez Crisis and Clementine believed that many of his visits to the United States in the following years were attempts to help repair Anglo-American relations. After leaving the premiership, Churchill remained an MP until he stood down at the 1964 general election. Apart from 1922 to 1924, he had been an MP since October 1900 and had represented five constituencies.

By the time of the 1959 general election, he seldom attended the House of Commons. Despite the Conservative landslide in 1959, his own majority in Woodford fell by more than 1000. He spent most of his retirement at Chartwell or at his London home in Hyde Park Gate, and became a habitué of high society at La Pausa on the French Riviera.

In June 1962, when he was 87, Churchill had a fall in Monte Carlo and broke his hip. He was flown home to a London hospital where he remained for three weeks. Jenkins says that Churchill was never the same after this accident and his last two years were something of a twilight period. In 1963, US President John F. Kennedy, acting under authorisation granted by an Act of Congress, proclaimed him an honorary citizen of the United States, but he was unable to attend the White House ceremony. There has been speculation that he became very depressed in his final years but this has been emphatically denied by his personal secretary Anthony Montague Browne, who was with him for his last 10 years. Montague Browne wrote that he never heard Churchill refer to depression and certainly he did not suffer from it.

Death, funeral and memorials

Churchill suffered his final stroke on 12 January 1965 and died twelve days later on the 24th, the seventieth anniversary of his father's death. Like the Duke of Wellington in 1852 and William Gladstone in 1898, Churchill was given a state funeral. Planning for this had begun in 1953 under the code-name of "Operation Hope Not" and a detailed plan had been produced by 1958. His coffin lay in state at Westminster Hall for three days and the funeral ceremony was at St Paul's Cathedral on 30 January. Afterwards, the coffin was taken by boat along the River Thames to Waterloo Station and from there by a special train to the family plot at St Martin's Church, Bladon, near his birthplace at Blenheim Palace.

Worldwide, numerous memorials have been dedicated to Churchill. His statue in Parliament Square was unveiled by his widow Clementine in 1973 and is one of only twelve in the square, all of prominent political figures, including Churchill's friend Lloyd George and his India policy nemesis Gandhi. Elsewhere in London, the wartime Cabinet War Rooms have been renamed the Churchill Museum and Cabinet War Rooms. Churchill College, Cambridge, was established as a national memorial to Churchill.  An indication of Churchill's high esteem in the UK is the result of the 2002 BBC poll, attracting 447,423 votes, in which he was voted the greatest Briton of all time, his nearest rival being Isambard Kingdom Brunel some 56,000 votes behind.

He is one of only eight people to be granted honorary citizenship of the United States; others include Lafayette, Raoul Wallenberg and Mother Teresa. Other memorials in North America include the National Churchill Museum in Fulton, Missouri, where he made the 1946 "Iron Curtain" speech; Churchill Square in central Edmonton, Alberta; and the Winston Churchill Range, a mountain range northwest of Lake Louise, also in Alberta, which was renamed after Churchill in 1956.

Churchill Archives Centre on the campus of Churchill College at the University of Cambridge houses Churchill's personal papers and is open to the public.

Artist, historian, and writer

Churchill was a prolific writer. His output included a novel (Savrola), two biographies, three volumes of memoirs, several histories, and numerous press articles. Two of his most famous works, published after his first premiership brought his international fame to new heights, were his six-volume memoir, The Second World War, and the four-volume A History of the English-Speaking Peoples. In recognition of his "mastery of historical and biographical description" and oratorial output, Churchill received the Nobel Prize in Literature in 1953.

He used either "Winston S. Churchill" or "Winston Spencer Churchill" as his pen name to avoid confusion with the American novelist of the same name, with whom he struck up a friendly correspondence. For many years, he relied heavily upon his press articles to assuage his financial worries: in 1937, for example, he wrote 64 published articles and some of his contracts were quite lucrative.

As well as writing, Churchill became an accomplished amateur artist after his resignation from the Admiralty in 1915. Using the pseudonym "Charles Morin", he continued this hobby throughout his life and completed hundreds of paintings, many of which are on show in the studio at Chartwell as well as in private collections.

Churchill was an amateur bricklayer, constructing buildings and garden walls at Chartwell. To further this hobby, he joined the Amalgamated Union of Building Trade Workers but was expelled after he revived his membership of the Conservative Party. He also bred butterflies at Chartwell, keeping them in a converted summerhouse each year until the weather was right for their release. He was well known for his love of animals and always had several pets, mainly cats but also dogs, pigs, lambs, bantams, goats and fox cubs among others. Churchill has often been quoted as saying that "cats look down on us and dogs look up to us, but pigs treat us as equals", or words to that effect, but the International Churchill Society believe he has mostly been misquoted.

Legacy and assessments

"A man of destiny"

Roy Jenkins concludes his biography of Churchill by comparing him favourably with W. E. Gladstone and summarising:

Churchill always self-confidently believed himself to be "a man of destiny". Because of this he lacked restraint and could be reckless. His self-belief manifested itself in terms of his "affinity with war" of which, according to Sebastian Haffner, he exhibited "a profound and innate understanding". Churchill considered himself a military genius but that made him vulnerable to failure and Paul Addison says Gallipoli was "the greatest blow his self-image was ever to sustain". Jenkins points out, however, that although Churchill was excited and exhilarated by war, he was never indifferent to the suffering it causes.

Political ideology

As a politician, Churchill was perceived by some observers to have been largely motivated by personal ambition rather than political principle. During his early parliamentary career, he was often deliberately provocative and argumentative to an unusual degree; and his barbed rhetorical style earned him many enemies in parliament. On the other hand, he was deemed to be an honest politician who displayed particular loyalty to his family and close friends. He was, according to Jenkins, "singularly lacking in inhibition or concealment". Robert Rhodes James said he "lacked any capacity for intrigue and was refreshingly innocent and straightforward".

Until the outbreak of the Second World War, Churchill's approach to politics generated widespread "mistrust and dislike", largely on account of his two party defections. His biographers have variously categorised him, in terms of political ideology, as "fundamentally conservative", "(always) liberal in outlook", and "never circumscribed by party affiliation". Jenkins says that Churchill's self-belief was "far stronger than any class or tribal loyalty". Whether Churchill was a conservative or a liberal, he was nearly always opposed to socialism because of its propensity for state planning and his belief in free markets. The exception was during his wartime coalition when he was completely reliant upon the support of his Labour colleagues. Although the Labour leaders were willing to join his coalition, Churchill had long been regarded as an enemy of the working class. His response to the Rhondda Valley unrest and his anti-socialist rhetoric brought condemnation from socialists. They saw him as a reactionary who represented imperialism, militarism, and the interests of the upper classes in the class war. His role in opposing the General Strike earned the enmity of many strikers and most members of the Labour movement. Paradoxically, Churchill was supportive of trade unionism, which he saw as the "antithesis of socialism".

On the other hand, his detractors did not take Churchill's domestic reforms into account, for he was in many respects a radical and a reformer, but always with the intention of preserving the existing social structure, never of challenging it. He could not empathise with the poor, so he sympathised with them instead, displaying what Addison calls the attitude of a "benevolent paternalist". Jenkins, himself a senior Labour minister, remarked that Churchill had "a substantial record as a social reformer" for his work in the early years of his ministerial career. Similarly, Rhodes James thought that, as a social reformer, Churchill's achievements were "considerable". This, said Rhodes James, had been achieved because Churchill as a minister had "three outstanding qualities. He worked hard; he put his proposals efficiently through the Cabinet and Parliament; he carried his Department with him. These ministerial merits are not as common as might be thought".

Imperialism and racial views

Assessments of Churchill's legacy are largely based on his leadership of the British people in the Second World War. Even so, his personal views on empire and race continue to stir debate. Churchill was a staunch imperialist and monarchist, and he consistently exhibited a "romanticised view" of both the British Empire and the reigning monarch, especially of Elizabeth II during his last term as premier.

Churchill has been described as a "liberal imperialist" who saw British imperialism as a form of altruism that benefited its subject peoples because "by conquering and dominating other peoples, the British were also elevating and protecting them". Martin Gilbert asserted that Churchill held a hierarchical perspective of race, seeing racial characteristics as signs of the maturity of a society. Churchill's views on race were driven by his imperialist mindset and outlook. He advocated against black or indigenous self-rule in Africa, Australia, the Caribbean, the Americas and India, believing that the British Empire promoted and maintained the welfare of those who lived in the colonies; he insisted that "our responsibility to the native races remains a real one". In 1906, Churchill stated that "We will endeavour... to advance the principle of equal rights of civilized men irrespective of colour".

According to Addison, Churchill was opposed to immigration from the Commonwealth. Addison makes the point that Churchill opposed anti-Semitism (as in 1904, when he was fiercely critical of the proposed Aliens Bill) and argues that he would never have tried "to stoke up racial animosity against immigrants, or to persecute minorities".  In the 1920s, Churchill supported Zionism but believed that communism was the product of an international Jewish conspiracy; in an article in the Illustrated Sunday Herald, Churchill wrote that a group of "international" Jews supported a Bolshevist "world-wide conspiracy for the overthrow of civilisation and for the reconstitution of society on the basis of arrested development, of envious malevolence, and impossible equality". Although this belief was not unique among British politicians of the time, few had the stature of Churchill, and the article was criticised by the Jewish Chronicle at the time.

Churchill made a number of disparaging remarks about non-white ethnicities throughout his life, including a series of racist comments and jokes about Indian nationalists made to colleagues during the inter-war period and his wartime premiership. Historian Philip Murphy partly attributes the strength of this vitriol to an "almost childish desire to shock" his inner circle. Churchill's response to the Bengal famine was criticised by some contemporaries as slow (see ), a controversy later increased by the publication of private remarks made to Secretary for India Leo Amery, in which Churchill allegedly said that aid would be inadequate because "Indians [were] breeding like rabbits". Philip Murphy says that, following the independence of India in 1947, Churchill adopted a more pragmatic stance towards empire, although he continued to use imperial rhetoric. During his second term as prime minister, he was seen as a moderating influence on Britain's suppression of armed insurgencies against colonial rule in Malaya and Kenya; he argued that ruthless policies contradicted British values and international opinion.

Cultural depictions

While the biographies by Addison, Gilbert, Jenkins and Rhodes James are among the most acclaimed works about Churchill, he has been the subject of numerous others. Writing in 2012–13 for the International Churchill Society, Professor David Freeman counted 62 in total, excluding non-English books, to the end of the 20th century.

At a public ceremony in Westminster Hall on 30 November 1954, Churchill's 80th birthday, the joint Houses of Parliament presented him with a full-length portrait of himself, which had been painted by Graham Sutherland. Churchill and Clementine reportedly hated it and, later, she had it destroyed.

Churchill has been widely depicted on stage and screen. Notable screen biographical films include Young Winston (1972), directed by Richard Attenborough and featuring Simon Ward in the title role with Anne Bancroft and Robert Shaw as his parents; Winston Churchill: The Wilderness Years (1981; co-written by Martin Gilbert), starring Robert Hardy as Churchill and Siân Phillips as Clementine; The Gathering Storm (2002), starring Albert Finney as Churchill and Vanessa Redgrave as Clementine; Into the Storm (2009), starring Brendan Gleeson as Churchill and Janet McTeer as Clementine; Darkest Hour (2017), starring Gary Oldman as Churchill. John Lithgow played Churchill in The Crown (2016–2019). Finney, Gleeson, Oldman and Lithgow all won major awards for their performances as Churchill.

Family and ancestry

Marriage and children

Churchill married Clementine Hozier in September 1908. They remained married for 57 years. Churchill was aware of the strain that his political career placed on his marriage, and, according to Colville, he had a brief affair in the 1930s with Doris Castlerosse, although this is discounted by Andrew Roberts.

The Churchills' first child, Diana, was born in July 1909; the second, Randolph, in May 1911. Their third, Sarah, was born in October 1914, and their fourth, Marigold, in November 1918. Marigold died in August 1921, from sepsis of the throat, and she was buried in Kensal Green Cemetery.  Although her remains were re-located to Bladon churchyard in 2019 to join the rest of her family, her cenotaph still stands at Kensal Green. On 15 September 1922, the Churchills' last child, Mary, was born. Later that month, the Churchills bought Chartwell, which would be their home until Winston's death in 1965. According to Jenkins, Churchill was an "enthusiastic and loving father" but one who expected too much of his children.

Ancestry

Notes

References

Citations

Bibliography

 
 
 
 
 
 
 
 
 
 
 
 
 
 
 
 
 
 
 
 
 
 
 
 
 
 
 
 
 
 
 
 
 
 
 
 
 
  *

Further reading

 
 
 
 
 
  Link
  Link
  Link
  Link
  Link
  Link
  Link
  Link
  Link
  Link
  Link
 
 
 
  Link
 
  Link
  Library Link
  Library Link
  Link
  Link  (published in England as "Arms and the Covenant": Link)
  Link
 
 
 
 
 
 
 
 
 
 
 
  Link
 
 
  The book includes illustrations of more than 500 paintings by Churchill.

External links

 
 Churchill's First World War from the Imperial War Museum.
 FBI files on Winston Churchill.
 Winston Churchill's Personal Manuscripts.
 

Bibliographies and online collections
 
 
 
 

Recordings
 EarthStation1: Winston Churchill Speech Audio Archive.
 Amateur colour film footage of Churchill's funeral from the Imperial War Museum.

Museums, archives and libraries
 
 
 
 Records and images from the UK Parliament Collections.
 The International Churchill Society (ICS).
 Imperial War Museum: Churchill War Rooms. Comprising the original underground War Rooms preserved since 1945, including the Cabinet Room, the Map Room and Churchill's bedroom, and the new Museum dedicated to Churchill's life.
 War Cabinet Minutes (1942), (1942–43), (1945–46), (1946).
 Locations of correspondence and papers of Churchill at the UK National Archives.
 

|-

|-

|-

|-

|-

|-

|-

|-

|-

|-

|-

|-

|-

|-

|-

|-

|-

|-

|-

|-

|-

|-

|-

|-

|-

|-

|-

|-

|-

|-

 
1874 births
1965 deaths
19th-century English writers
20th-century English historians
20th-century prime ministers of the United Kingdom
20th-century English biographers
4th Queen's Own Hussars officers
Admiralty personnel of World War II
British Army personnel of World War I
British Army personnel of the Mahdist War
British Empire in World War II
British escapees
British journalists
British military personnel of the Malakand Frontier War
British monarchists
British prisoners of war of the Second Boer War
British war correspondents
British Zionists
Burials at St Martin's Church, Bladon
Chancellors of the Duchy of Lancaster
Chancellors of the Exchequer of the United Kingdom
Chancellors of the University of Bristol
Companions of the Liberation
Congressional Gold Medal recipients
Conservative Party (UK) MPs for English constituencies
Conservative Party prime ministers of the United Kingdom
Deputy Lieutenants of Kent
English Christians
English agnostics
English anti-fascists
English biographers
English knights
English people of American descent
Fellows of the Royal Society
First Lords of the Admiralty
Foreign recipients of the Distinguished Service Medal (United States)
Freemasons of the United Grand Lodge of England
Georgist politicians
Graduates of the Royal Military College, Sandhurst
History of the tank
Honorary air commodores
Honorary Fellows of the British Academy
Knights of the Garter
Leaders of the Conservative Party (UK)
Leaders of the House of Commons of the United Kingdom
Leaders of the Opposition (United Kingdom)
Liberal Party (UK) MPs for English constituencies
Lords Warden of the Cinque Ports
Members of Trinity House
Members of the Order of Merit
Members of the Order of the Companions of Honour
Members of the Parliament of the United Kingdom for constituencies in Lancashire
Members of the Parliament of the United Kingdom for Dundee constituencies
Members of the Privy Council of the United Kingdom
Members of the King's Privy Council for Canada
Members of the Royal Academy of Belgium
Ministers in the Chamberlain wartime government, 1939–1940
 
 
 
Military personnel from Oxfordshire
National Liberal Party (UK, 1922) politicians
Nobel laureates in Literature
People educated at Harrow School
People educated at St. George's School, Ascot
People from Woodstock, Oxfordshire
British anti-communists
People of the Cold War
People with mood disorders
People with speech impediment
Politicians awarded knighthoods
Presidents of the Board of Trade
Prime Ministers of the United Kingdom
Queen's Own Oxfordshire Hussars officers
Recipients of the Croix de Guerre 1939–1945 (France)
Recipients of the Croix de guerre (Belgium)
Recipients of the Distinguished Service Medal (US Army)
Recipients of the Order of the Star of Nepal
Recipients of the Order of the White Lion
Rectors of the University of Aberdeen
Rectors of the University of Edinburgh
Royal Scots Fusiliers officers
Scottish Liberal Party MPs
Secretaries of State for Air (UK)
Secretaries of State for War (UK)
Secretaries of State for the Colonies
Secretaries of State for the Home Department
South African Light Horse officers
Time Person of the Year
UK MPs 1900–1906
UK MPs 1906–1910
UK MPs 1910
UK MPs 1910–1918
UK MPs 1918–1922
UK MPs 1924–1929
UK MPs 1929–1931
UK MPs 1931–1935
UK MPs 1935–1945
UK MPs 1945–1950
UK MPs 1950–1951
UK MPs 1951–1955
UK MPs 1955–1959
UK MPs 1959–1964
Victorian writers
World War II political leaders